Marco McCullough (born 22 November 1989) is a Northern Irish former super-featherweight boxer. His career ran a total of 9 years, from 2011 to 2019 after his debut on June 25 of 2011. In 2013, he defeated Willie Casey for the Boxing Union of Ireland featherweight title. McCullough defeated former world champion Dimitri Kirilov for the World Boxing Organization (WBO) European featherweight title.  He has also won the intercontinental title for the World Boxing Organization (WBO). He lost to Isaac Lowe for the Commonwealth featherweight title.

McCullough lost to Ryan Walsh for the British featherweight title due to a technical knockout (TKO). Since his defeat to Ryan Wash, McCullough moved up to super-featherweight where he has won the IBO International Title and the IBF European Title, defeating Ruddy Encarnacion and Declan Geraghty respectively. McCullough's final official pro-boxing event was a victory against Declan Geraghty on May 17, 2019, via TKO for the Super Feather Title.

Professional boxing record

|-
| style="text-align:center;" colspan=9|22 Wins (12 Knockouts), 4 Losses, 0 Draws
|-  style="text-align:center; background:#e3e3e3;"
| style="border-style:none none solid solid; "|Result
| style="border-style:none none solid solid; "|Record
| style="border-style:none none solid solid; "|Opponent
| style="border-style:none none solid solid; "|Type
| style="border-style:none none solid solid; "|Round
| style="border-style:none none solid solid; "|Date
| style="border-style:none none solid solid; "|Location
| style="border-style:none none style style; "|Notes
|- align=center
|Win
|1-0
|align=left| Eddie Nesbitt
|
|
|
|align=left| Craigavon Leisure Centre, Craigavon, Northern Ireland
|
|- align=center
|Loss
|1-1
|align=left| Dai Davies
|
|
|
|align=left| Odyssey Arena, Belfast, Northern Ireland
|
|- align=center
|Win
|2-1
|align=left| Sean Watson
|
|
|
|align=left| Odyssey Arena, Belfast, Northern Ireland
|
|- align=center
|Win
|3-1
|align=left| Hyusein Hyuseinov
|
|
|
|align=left| Holiday Inn, Belfast, Northern Ireland
|
|- align=center
|Win
|4-1
|align=left| Valentin Marinov
|
|
|
|align=left| Ulster Hall, Belfast, Northern Ireland
|
|- align=center
|Win
|5-1
|align=left| Michael Kelly
|
|
|
|align=left| Odyssey Arena, Belfast, Northern Ireland
|
|- align=center
|Win
|6-1
|align=left| Ibrar Riyaz
|
|
|
|align=left| Odyssey Arena, Belfast, Northern Ireland
|
|- align=center
|Win
|7-1
|align=left| Noel O'Brien
|
|
|
|align=left| City Hall, Belfast, Northern Ireland
|
|- align=center
|Win
|8-1
|align=left| Willie Casey
|
|
|
|align=left| Odyssey Arena, Belfast, Northern Ireland
|
|- align=center
|Win
|9-1
|align=left| Elemir Rafael
|
|
|
|align=left| Odyssey Arena, Belfast, Northern Ireland
|
|- align=center
|Win
|10-1
|align=left| Martin Parlagi
|
|
|
|align=left| Waterfront Hall, Belfast, Northern Ireland
|
|- align=center
|Win
|11-1
|align=left| Dmitry Kirilov
|
|
|
|align=left| Titanic Quarter, Belfast, Northern Ireland
|
|- align=center
|Win
|12-1
|align=left| Malkhaz Tatrishvili
|
|
|
|align=left| Odyssey Arena, Belfast, Northern Ireland
|
|- align=center
|Loss
|12-2
|align=left| Zoltan Kovacs
|
|
|
|align=left| Sportpalast, Bielefeld, Germany
|
|- align=center
|Win
|13-2
|align=left| Sergejs Logins
|
|
|
|align=left| Meadowbank Sports Centre, Edinburgh, Scotland
|
|-
|Win
|14-2
|align=left| Sergio Prado
|
|
|
|align=left| Waterfront Hall, Belfast, Northern Ireland
|
|-
|Loss
|14-3
|align=left| Isaac Lowe
|
|
|
|align=left| Manchester Arena, Manchester, England
|
|-
|Win
|15-3
|align=left| Simas Volosinas
|
|
|
|align=left| Crowne Plaza Hotel, Glasgow, Scotland
|
|-
|Win
|16-3
|align=left| Luis Lugo
|
|
|
|align=left| Titanic Exhibition Centre, Belfast, Northern Ireland
|
|-
|Win
|17-3
|align=left| Leonel Hernandez
|
|
|
|align=left| Waterfront Hall, Belfast, Northern Ireland
|
|-
|Loss
|17-4
|align=left| Ryan Walsh
|
|
|
|align=left| Copper Box Arena, Hackney Wick, England
|
|-
|Win
|18-4
|align=left| Josh Baillie
|
|
|
|align=left| The SSE Arena, Belfast, Northern Ireland
|
|-
|Win
|19-4
|align=left| Arnoldo Solano
|
|
|
|align=left| The SSE Arena, Belfast, Northern Ireland
|
|-
|Win
|20-4
|align=left| Jordan Ellison
|
|
|
|align=left| Windsor Park, Belfast, Northern Ireland
|
|-
|Win
|21-4
|align=left| Rudy Encarnacion
|
|
|
|align=left| Titanic Exhibition Centre, Belfast, Northern Ireland
|
|- align=center
|Win
|22-4
|align=left| Declan Geraghty
|
|
|
|align=left| Ulster Hall, Belfast, Northern Ireland
|

References

External links
 

1989 births
Living people
Male boxers from Northern Ireland
Featherweight boxers
Super-featherweight boxers
Boxers from Belfast